Menard is an unincorporated community in Randolph County, Illinois, United States. Menard is located on the east bank of the Mississippi River, west of Chester. Menard Correctional Center is located within the community. Menard has a post office with ZIP code 62259.

Government and infrastructure
The Illinois Department of Corrections Menard Correctional Center is located in the Menard area and in Chester. Prior to the January 11, 2003 commutation of death row sentences, male death row inmates were housed in Menard, Tamms, and Pontiac correctional centers. After that date, only Pontiac continued to host the male death row.

References

Unincorporated communities in Randolph County, Illinois
Unincorporated communities in Illinois